{{Speciesbox
|image=
|image_caption=
|status=DD
|status_system=IUCN3.1
|status_ref=<ref name=iucn>{{cite iucn |author1=G. Lyons |author2=L. Allcock |title='Opisthoteuthis pluto |volume=2014 |page=e.T163178A980634 |doi=}}</ref>
|genus=Opisthoteuthis
|species=pluto
|authority=Berry, 1918
}}Opisthoteuthis pluto''' is a deep-sea cirrate octopus found in the Great Australian Bight south of Australia. Although their habitat is threatened, it is unclear how the species is affected, if at all. O. pluto is named for the Greek and Roman god of the Underworld.

Description
The octopus is known from multiple specimens. The largest specimen, a male, spanned  from arm tip to arm tip. Like other members of the genus Opisthoteuthis, this octopus is sexually dimorphic. The male has a few greatly enlarged suckers, while the female does not.  According to S. Stillman Berry, who described O. pluto'', the octopus was capable of partially retracting its suckers and cirri (the small tendrils lining the arms). The octopus has a dark color, which helps it camouflage with the ocean floor.

References

External links
Photograph of original specimen

Octopuses
Cephalopods of Australia
Molluscs of the Indian Ocean